Trinity College, officially The College of the Holy and Undivided Trinity of Queen Elizabeth near Dublin, is the sole constituent college of the University of Dublin, a research university in Dublin, Ireland. Queen Elizabeth I founded the college in 1592 as "the mother of a university" that was modelled after the collegiate universities of Oxford and Cambridge, but unlike these affiliated institutions, only one college was ever established; as such, the designations "Trinity College" and "University of Dublin" are usually synonymous for practical purposes.

Trinity College Dublin is a sister college to St John's College, Cambridge, and Oriel College, Oxford, and by incorporation, a graduate of Dublin, Oxford or Cambridge can be conferred the equivalent degree at either of the other two without further examination. The university is legally incorporated by "the Provost, Fellows, Foundation Scholars and other members of the Board," as outlined by its founding charter. It is one of the seven ancient universities of Britain and Ireland, as well as Ireland's oldest surviving university. The college's main campus, in the heart of Dublin, has often been ranked among the most iconic in the world, and is the setting for a number of novels, films and urban legends.

Widely considered one of Europe's elite institutions, Trinity is Ireland's most prestigious university, in part due to its long and distinguished history. Academically, it is divided into three faculties comprising 23 schools, offering degree and diploma courses at both undergraduate and postgraduate levels. The admission procedure is based exclusively on academic merit, with the college being particularly acclaimed in law, literature and humanities. It also carries out extensive research in nanotechnology, information technology, immunology, mathematics, engineering, psychology, politics and English. Trinity College was originally established outside Dublin's city walls in the buildings of the outlawed Catholic Augustinian Priory of All Hallows. It was set up in part to consolidate the rule of the Tudor monarchy in Ireland, and as a result was the university of the Protestant Ascendancy for much of its history. While Catholics were admitted from the college's foundation, for a period graduation required the taking of an oath that was objectionable to them. In 1793 this requirement was removed, but certain restrictions on membership of the college remained, as professorships, fellowships and scholarships were reserved for Protestants. An 1873 Act of Parliament lifted these remaining restrictions. While Catholics were not formally banned from attending Trinity from that time, Ireland's Catholic hierarchy discouraged it. Women were first admitted to the college as full members in 1904.

The Library of Trinity College is a legal deposit library for Ireland and Great Britain, containing around 7 million printed volumes and significant quantities of manuscripts, including the Book of Kells, which arrived at the college in 1661 for safekeeping after the Cromwellian raids on religious institutions. The collection housed in the Long Room includes a rare copy of the 1916 Proclamation of the Irish Republic and a 15th-century wooden harp, which is the model for the current emblem of Ireland. The library receives more than 500,000 visitors per year, making it the most important in Ireland.

The university has educated many of Ireland's most successful poets, playwrights and authors, including Oscar Wilde, Jonathan Swift, Bram Stoker, Percy French, William Trevor, John Millington Synge, Sally Rooney, Oliver Goldsmith, Thomas Moore and William Congreve; Nobel Laureates Samuel Beckett, Ernest Walton, Mairead Maguire and William Cecil Campbell; former Presidents of Ireland Douglas Hyde, Éamon de Valera, Mary Robinson, and Mary McAleese; philosophers George Berkeley and Edmund Burke; politicians David Norris, Edward Carson, Robert Emmet, Wolfe Tone and John Redmond, as well as mathematicians George Salmon, Robert Mallet, Bartholomew Lloyd and William Rowan Hamilton. Notable faculty members at the university included Humphrey Lloyd, J. B. Bury and E. T. Whittaker.

Trinity College Dublin became the first and only Irish university to enter the Top 50 rankings of both the QS World University Rankings and the Times Higher Education in 2009, when it was ranked 43rd in the world. It is positioned 98th in the world as of 2022, and in 2021, it was also ranked the European Union's most international university, with nearly 30% of its student population from outside Ireland.

History

Early history
The first University of Dublin (known as the Medieval University of Dublin and unrelated to Trinity College) was created by Pope Clement V in 1311, and had a Chancellor, lecturers and students (granted protection by the Crown) over many years, before coming to an end at the Reformation.

After that, and some debate about a new university at St. Patrick's Cathedral, in 1592 a small group of Dublin citizens obtained a charter by way of letters patent from Queen Elizabeth incorporating Trinity College at the former site of All Hallows monastery, southeast of the city walls, provided by the Corporation of Dublin. The college's first provost was the Archbishop of Dublin, Adam Loftus (after whose former college at Cambridge the institution was named), and he was provided with two initial Fellows, James Hamilton and James Fullerton. Two years after foundation, a few Fellows and students began to work in the new college, which then lay around one small square.

During the next 50 years the community increased the endowments; considerable landed estates were secured; new fellowships were founded; the books which formed the foundation of the great library were acquired; a curriculum was devised; and statutes were framed. On several occasions the founding Letters Patent were amended by succeeding monarchs, such as James I in 1613 and most notably Charles I in 1637; he increased the number of fellows from seven to 16, established the Board – then the Provost and the seven senior Fellows – and reduced the panel of Visitors in size. They were supplemented as late as the reign of Queen Victoria, and later still amended by the Oireachtas in 2000.

18th and 19th centuries

During the 18th century Trinity College was seen as the university of the Protestant Ascendancy. Parliament, meeting on the other side of College Green, made generous grants for building. The first building of this period was the Old Library, begun in 1712, followed by the Printing House and the Dining Hall. During the second half of the century, Parliament Square slowly emerged. The great building drive was completed in the early 19th century by Botany Bay, the square which derives its name in part from the herb garden it once contained (and which was succeeded by Trinity College's own Botanic Gardens). While Catholics were admitted from foundation, graduation was complicated by the requirement of oaths. Following early steps in Catholic Emancipation, these oaths were removed, allowing Catholics to graduate in 1793, before the equivalent change at the University of Cambridge and the University of Oxford. Certain disabilities remained. In December 1845 Denis Caulfield Heron was the subject of a hearing at Trinity College. He had previously been examined and, on merit, declared a scholar of the college, but had not been allowed to take up his place due to his Catholic religion. Heron appealed to the Courts, which issued a writ of mandamus requiring the case to be adjudicated by the Archbishop of Dublin and the Primate of Ireland. The decision of Richard Whately and John George de la Poer Beresford was that Heron would remain excluded from Scholarship. This decision confirmed that persons who were not Anglicans (Presbyterians were also affected) could not be elected to Scholarship or Fellowship or be made a professor. But after less than three decades of this, all disabilities imposed on Catholics were repealed, as in 1873, all religious tests were abolished, except for entry to the divinity school. In 1871, Irish Catholic bishops, responding to the increased ease with which Catholics could attend an Institution which the bishops saw as thoroughly Protestant in ethos, and in light of the establishment of the Catholic University of Ireland, implemented a general ban on Catholics entering Trinity College, with few exceptions. "The ban," despite its longevity, is associated in the popular mind with Archbishop of Dublin John Charles McQuaid, as he was made responsible for enforcing it from 1956 until the Catholic Bishops of Ireland rescinded it in 1970, shortly before McQuaid's retirement. Until 1956, it was the responsibility of the local bishop.

The 19th century was also marked by important developments in the professional schools. The law school was reorganized after the middle of the century. Medical teaching had been given in the college since 1711, but it was only after the establishment of the school on a firm basis by legislation in 1800, and under the inspiration of one Macartney, that it was in a position to play its full part, with such teachers as Graves and Stokes, in the great age of Dublin medicine. The Engineering School was established in 1842 and was one of the first of its kind in Ireland and Britain.

20th century

In April 1900, Queen Victoria visited College Green in Dublin.

Women were admitted to Trinity College as full members for the first time in 1904. From 1904 to 1907, women from Oxford and Cambridge came to Trinity College to receive their ad eundem degree and were known as Steamboat ladies.

In 1907, the Chief Secretary for Ireland proposed the reconstitution of the University of Dublin. A "Dublin University Defence Committee" was created and successfully campaigned against any change to the status quo, while the Catholic bishops' rejection of the idea ensured its failure among the Catholic population. Chief among the bishops' concerns was the remains of the Catholic University of Ireland, which would become subsumed into a new university, which on account of Trinity College would be part Anglican. Ultimately this episode led to the creation of the National University of Ireland. Trinity College was one of the targets of the Volunteer and Citizen Army forces during the 1916 Easter Rising but was successfully defended by a small number of unionist students, most of whom were members of the university Officers' Training Corps. From July 1917 to March 1918 the Irish Convention met in the college in an attempt to address the political aftermath of the Easter rising. (Subsequently, following the failure of the Convention to reach "substantial agreement", the Irish Free State was set up in 1922.) In the post-independence period Trinity College suffered from a cool relationship with the new state. On 3 May 1955, the provost, A.J. McConnell, wrote in the Irish Times that certain state-funded County Council scholarships excluded Trinity College from the list of approved institutions. This, he suggested, amounted to religious discrimination, which was forbidden by the constitution. It has been said of the period before Éire left the Commonwealth that "The overwhelming majority of the undergraduates were ex-unionists or, if from Northern Ireland, unionists. Loyalty to the Crown was instinctive and they were proud to be British subjects and Commonwealth citizens" and that "The College still clung, so far as circumstances permitted, to its pre-Treaty loyalties, symbolized by the flying of the Union Jack on suitable occasions and a universal wearing of poppies on Armistice Day, the chapel being packed for the two minutes' silence followed by a lusty rendering of 'God Save the King...". "But by the close of the 1960's ... Trinity, with the overwhelming majority of its undergraduate population coming from the Republic, to a great extent conformed to local patterns".

The School of Commerce was established in 1925, and the School of Social Studies in 1934. Also in 1934, the first female professor was appointed.

In 1944 Archbishop of Dublin John Charles McQuaid required Catholics in the Dublin archdiocese to obtain a special dispensation before entering the university. The ban was extended nationally at the Plenary Synod of Maynooth in August 1956. Despite this sectarianism, 1958 saw the first Catholic reach the Board of Trinity as a Senior Fellow.

In 1962 the School of Commerce and the School of Social Studies amalgamated to form the School of Business and Social Studies. In 1969 the several schools and departments were grouped into Faculties as follows: Arts (Humanities and Letters); Business, Economic and Social Studies; Engineering and Systems Sciences; Health Sciences (since October 1977 all undergraduate teaching in dental science in the Dublin area has been in Trinity College); and Science.

In 1970 the Catholic Church lifted its ban on Catholics attending the college without special dispensation. At the same time, Trinity College authorities invited the appointment of a Catholic chaplain to be based in the college. There are now two such Catholic chaplains.

In the late 1960s, there was a proposal for University College, Dublin, of the National University of Ireland, to become a constituent college of a newly reconstituted University of Dublin. This plan, suggested by Brian Lenihan and Donogh O'Malley, was dropped after officials of both universities opposed it.

From 1975, the Colleges of Technology that now form the Dublin Institute of Technology had their degrees conferred by the University of Dublin. This arrangement was discontinued in 1998 when the DIT obtained degree-granting powers of its own.

The School of Pharmacy was established in 1977, and around the same time, the Faculty of Veterinary Medicine was transferred to University College, Dublin in exchange for its Dental School. Student numbers increased sharply during the 1980s and 1990s, with total enrolment more than doubling, leading to pressure on resources and a subsequent investment programme.

In 1991, Thomas Noel Mitchell became the first Roman Catholic elected Provost of Trinity College.

21st century

Trinity College is today in the centre of Dublin. At the beginning of the new century, it embarked on a radical overhaul of academic structures to reallocate funds and reduce administration costs, resulting in, for instance, the reduction from six to five to eventually three faculties under a subsequent restructuring by a later governing authority. The ten-year strategic plan prioritises four research themes with which the college seeks to compete for funding at the global level. Comparative funding statistics reviewing the difference in departmental unit costs and overall costs before and after this restructuring are not apparent.

The Hamilton Mathematics Institute in Trinity College, named in honour of William Rowan Hamilton, was launched in 2005 and aims to improve the international profile of Irish mathematics, to raise public awareness of mathematics and to support local mathematical research through workshops, conferences and a visitor programme.

In 2021, Linda Doyle was elected the first woman provost, succeeding Patrick Prendergast.

Buildings and grounds

Trinity College retains a tranquil collegiate atmosphere despite its location in the centre of a capital city (and despite its being one of Dublin's most prominent tourist attractions). This is, in large part, due to the compact design of the college, whose main buildings look inwards and are arranged in large quadrangles (called squares), and the existence of only a few public entrances.

The main college grounds are approximately 190,000 m2 (47 acres), including the Trinity College Enterprise Centre nearby, and buildings account for around 200,000 m2, ranging from works of older architecture to more modern buildings. The college's main entrance is on the College Green, and its grounds are bounded by Nassau and Pearse Streets. The college is bisected by College Park, which has a cricket and rugby pitch.

The college's western side is older, featuring the Campanile, as well as many fine buildings, including the Chapel and Examination Hall (designed by Sir William Chambers), Graduates Memorial Building, Museum Building, and the Rubrics (the sole surviving section of the original 17th century quadrangle), all spread across the college's five squares. The Provost's House sits a little way up from the College Front Gate such that the House is actually on Grafton Street, one of the two principal shopping streets in the city, while its garden faces into the college. The Douglas Hyde Gallery, a contemporary art gallery, is in the college, as is the Samuel Beckett Theatre. It hosts national and international performances and is used by the Dublin International Theatre Festival, the Dublin Dance Festival, and The Fringe Festival, among others. During the academic term it is predominantly used as a teaching and performance space for drama students and staff.

The college's eastern side is occupied by science buildings, most of which are modern developments, arranged in three rows instead of quadrangles. In 2010, Forbes ranked it one of the 15 most beautiful college grounds in the world.

Trinity also incorporates a number of buildings and facilities spread throughout the city, from the politics and sociology departments, on Dame Street, to the Faculty of Health Sciences buildings, at St. James's Hospital and Tallaght University Hospital. The Trinity Centre at St James's Hospital incorporates additional teaching rooms, as well as the Institute of Molecular Medicine and John Durkan Leukaemia Institute. The college also owns a large set of residences four kilometres south of the college on the Dartry Road, in Rathmines, called Trinity Hall.

In November 2018, the college announced plans, estimated at €230 million, to develop university research facilities on a site in Grand Canal Dock as part of an "Innovation District" for the area.

Chapel

The current chapel was completed in 1798, and was designed by George III's architect, Sir William Chambers, who also designed the public theatre opposite the chapel on Parliament Square. Reflecting the college's Anglican heritage, there are daily services of Morning prayer, weekly services of Evensong, and Holy Communion is celebrated on Tuesdays and Sundays. It is no longer compulsory for students to attend these.

The chapel has been ecumenical since 1970, and is now also used daily in the celebration of Mass for the college's Roman Catholic members. In addition to the Anglican chaplain, who is known as the Dean of Residence, there are two Roman Catholic chaplains and one Methodist chaplain. Ecumenical events are often held in the chapel, such as the annual carol service and the service of thanksgiving on Trinity Monday.

Library

The Library of Trinity College is Ireland's largest research library. As a result of its historic standing, Trinity College Library Dublin is a legal deposit library (as per Legal Deposit Libraries Act 2003) for the United Kingdom of Great Britain and Northern Ireland, and has a similar standing in Irish law. The college is therefore legally entitled to a copy of every book published in Great Britain and Ireland, and consequently receives over 100,000 new items every year. The library contains about five million books, including 30,000 current serials and significant collections of manuscripts, maps, and printed music. Three million books are held in the book depository, "Stacks", in Santry, from which requests are retrieved twice daily.

The Library proper comprises several buildings in college. The original (Old) Library is Thomas Burgh's masterpiece. A huge building, it originally towered over the university and city after its completion. Even today, surrounded by similarly scaled buildings, it is imposing and dominates the view of the university from Nassau Street. It was founded with the college and first endowed by James Ussher (1625–56), Archbishop of Armagh, who endowed his own valuable library, comprising several thousand printed books and manuscripts, to the college. The Book of Kells is by far the Library's most famous book and is in the Old Library, along with the Book of Durrow, the Book of Howth and other ancient texts. Also incorporating the Long Room, the Old Library receives 600,000 visitors per year, making it Dublin's third-most visited tourist destination. In the 18th century, the college received the Brian Boru harp, one of the three surviving medieval Gaelic harps, and a national symbol of Ireland, now housed in the library.

The buildings known as the college's BLU (Berkeley Lecky Ussher) Arts library complex consist of the Berkeley Library in Fellow's Square, built in 1956; the Lecky Library, attached to the Arts building; and the James Ussher Library, which, opening officially in 2003, overlooks College Park and houses the Glucksman Map Library. The Glucksman Library contains half a million printed maps, the largest collection of cartographic materials in Ireland. This includes the first Ordnance Surveys of Ireland, conducted in the early 19th century.

The name of the Berkeley Library has recently become the matter of some controversy, given George Berkeley's history as a slave trader, leading to a petition for renaming from the Students Union. In August 2022, incoming Student Union President Gabi Fullam announced that the Students Union would refer to the library as the "X Library" in all official communications pending renaming.

The Library also includes the William Hamilton Science and Engineering Library and the John Stearne Medical Library, housed at St James's Hospital.

Business School

The Trinity College Business School building is an €80 million construction for Trinity's Business School. It was inaugurated on 23 May 2019 by the Taoiseach, Leo Varadkar, an alumnus of Trinity College School of Medicine. The six-storey building, adjoining the Naughton Institute on the college's Pearse Street side, includes an Innovation and Entrepreneurial hub, a 600-seat auditorium, "smart classrooms" with digital technology, and an "executive education centre." The near-zero energy building provides a link between the city and the main University grounds.

Organisation

The college, officially incorporated as The Provost, Fellows and Scholars of the College of the Holy and Undivided Trinity of Queen Elizabeth near Dublin, is headed by the provost. Linda Doyle has been provost since August 2021.

The terms "University of Dublin" and "Trinity College" are generally considered synonymous for all practical purposes. Trinity was originally founded using the model of the University of Oxford and University of Cambridge in England, which are collegiate universities that each comprise several quasi-independent colleges. In one sense, the University of Dublin exists only as a degree-granting institution, with the college providing the education and research; Trinity College was the only college to ever be established within the university.

Governance

The body corporate of the college consists of the provost, fellows and scholars. The college is governed according to its statutes, which are, in effect, the College Constitution. Statutes are of two kinds, those which originally could only be amended by Royal Charter or Royal Letters Patent, and which now can only be changed by an Act of the Oireachtas, and those which can be changed by the board but only with the Fellows' consent. When a change requires parliamentary legislation, the customary procedure is that the Board requests the change by applying for a Private Bill. For this, the whole Body Corporate's consent is needed, with Scholars voting alongside Fellows. An example of a change that requires parliamentary legislation is an alteration to the composition of the Board. This last happened when the governance of the college and university was revised and restated by an Act of the Oireachtas in 2000.

Provost 
The provost serves a ten-year term and is elected by a body of electors consisting essentially of all full-time academic staff and a very small number of students. Originally the provost was appointed for life. While the provost was elected by the Fellows at the start, the appointment soon became a Crown one, reflecting the growing importance of the college and of the office of provost, which became both prestigious and well paid. But as time passed it became customary that the appointments were only made after taking soundings of college opinion, which meant mostly the views of the Board. With the establishment of the Free State in 1922, the power of appointment passed to the Government. It was agreed that when a vacancy occurred the college would provide a list of three candidates to the Government, from which the choice would be made. The college was allowed to rank the candidates in order of preference, and in practice the most preferred candidate was always appointed. Now the provost, while still formally appointed by the Government, is elected by staff plus student representatives, who gather in an electoral meeting and vote by exhaustive ballot until a candidate obtains an absolute majority; the process takes a day. The provost takes precedence over everyone else in the college, acts as the chief executive and accounting officer and chairs the board and council. The provost also enjoys a special status in the University of Dublin.

Fellows and Scholars 
Fellows and scholars are elected by the board. Fellows were once elected for life on the basis of a competitive examination. The number of fellows was fixed and a competition to fill a vacancy would occur on the death or resignation of a fellow. Originally all the teaching was carried out by the Fellows. Fellows are now elected from among current college academics and serve until reaching retirement age, and there is no formal limit on their number. Only a minority of academic staff are Fellows. Election to fellowship is recognition for staff that they have excelled in their field and amounts to a promotion for those receiving it. Any person appointed to a professorship who is not already a Fellow is elected a Fellow at the next opportunity.

Scholars continue to be selected by competitive examination from the Undergraduate body. The Scholarship examinations are now set separately for different undergraduate courses (so there is a scholarship examination in history, or in mathematics, engineering, and so forth). The Scholarship examination is taken in the second year of a four-year degree course (though, in special circumstances, such as illness, bereavement, or studying abroad during the second year, permission may be given to sit the examination in the third year). In theory, a student can sit the examination in any subject, not just the one they are studying. They hold their Scholarship until they are of "MA standing" - that is, three years after obtaining the BA degree. So most are Scholars for a term of five years.

Fellows are entitled to residence in the college free of charge; most fellows do not exercise this right in practice, with the legal requirement to provide accommodation to them fulfilled by providing an office. Scholars are also entitled to residence in the college free of charge; they also receive an allowance, and have the fees paid for courses they take within the college. But due to pressure on college accommodation, Scholars are no longer entitled, as they once were, to free rooms for the full duration of their scholarship should they cease to be students.  Fellows and Scholars are also entitled to one free meal a day, usually in the evening ("Commons"). Scholars retain the right to free meals for the full duration of their scholarship even after graduation, and ceasing to be students, should they choose to exercise it.

The Board
Aside from the provost, Fellows and Scholars, Trinity College has a Board (dating from 1637), which carries out general governance. Originally the Board consisted of the provost and Senior Fellows only. There were seven Senior Fellows, defined as those seven fellows that had served longest, Fellowship at that time being for life, unless resigned. Over the years a representational element was added, for example by having elected representatives of the Junior Fellows and of those professors who were not Fellows, with the last revision before Irish Independence being made by Royal Letters Patent in 1911. At that time there were, as well as the Senior Fellows, two elected representatives of those professors who were not Fellows and elected representatives of the Junior Fellows. Over the years, while formal revision did not take place, partly due to the complexity of the process, a number of additional representatives were added to the Board but as "observers" and not full voting members. These included representatives of academic staff who were not Fellows, and representatives of students. In practice all attending Board meetings were treated as equals, with votes, while not common, taken by a show of hands. But it remained the case that legally only the full members of the Board could have their votes recorded and it was mere convention that they always ratified the decision taken by the show of hands.

The governance of Trinity College was next formally changed in 2000, by the Oireachtas, in legislation proposed by the Board of the college and approved by the Body Corporate, viz., The Trinity College, Dublin (Charters and Letters Patent Amendment) Act, 2000. This was introduced separately from the Universities Act 1997. It states that the Board shall comprise
 The Provost, Vice-Provost/Chief Academic Officer, Senior Lecturer, Registrar and Bursar;
 Six Fellows;
 Five members of the academic staff who are not Fellows, at least three of whom must be of a rank not higher than senior lecturer;
 Two members of the academic staff of the rank of professor;
 Three members of the non-academic staff;
 Four students of the college, at least one of whom shall be a post-graduate student;
 One member, not an employee or student of the college, chosen by a Board committee from nominations made by organisations "representative of such business or professional interest as the Board considers appropriate";
 One member nominated by the Minister for Education following consultation with the Provost.

The Council
A Council, dating from 1874, oversees academic matters. All decisions of the Council require the approval of the Board, but if the decision in question does not require a new expenditure, the approval is normally formal, without debate. The council had a significant number of elected representatives from the start, and was also larger than the Board, which at that time continued to consist of the provost and seven Senior Fellows only. The council is the formal body which makes academic staff appointments, always, in practice on the recommendation of appointments panels which have themselves been appointed by the council. An illustration of the relationship between the Board and the council is a decision to create a new professorial chair. As this involves paying a salary, the initial decision to create the chair is made by the council, but the decision to make provision for the salary is made by the Board; consequently, the Board might overrule or defer a Council decision on grounds of cost.

The Senate

The University of Dublin was modelled on University of Oxford and University of Cambridge in the form of a collegiate university, Trinity College being the name given by the Queen as the mater universitatis ("mother of the university"). As no other college was ever established, the college is the university's sole constituent college, and so "Trinity College" and the "University of Dublin" are for most purposes synonymous. Still, the statutes of the university and the college grant the university separate corporate legal rights to own property and borrow money and employ staff. Moreover, while the board of the college has the sole power to propose amendments to the statutes of the university and college, amendments to the university statutes require the consent of the Senate of the university. Consequently, in theory, the Senate can overrule the Board, but only in very limited and particular circumstances. But it is also the case that the university cannot act independently of the initiative of the Board of Trinity College. The most common example of when the two bodies must collaborate is when a decision is made to establish a new degree. All matters relating to syllabus, examination and teaching are for the college to determine, but actual clearance for the award of the degree is a matter for the university. In the same way, when an individual is awarded an Honorary Degree, the proposal for the award is made by the Board of Trinity College, but this is subject to agreement by a vote of the Senate of Dublin University. All graduates of the university who have at least a master's degree are eligible to be members of the Senate, but in practice, only a few hundred are, with a large proportion being current members of the staff of Trinity College.

Visitors
The college also has an oversight structure of two visitors: the chancellor of the university, who is elected by the Senate, and the judicial visitor, who is appointed by the Irish Government from a list of two names submitted by the Senate of the university. The current judicial visitor is Maureen Harding Clark. In the event of a disagreement between the two visitors, the opinion of the chancellor prevails. The visitors act as a final "court of appeal" within the college, with their modes of appointment giving them the needed independence from the college administration.

Academic associations

Trinity College is a sister college to Oriel College of the University of Oxford and St John's College of the University of Cambridge.

Teaching and affiliated hospitals 
As of 2021, the teaching and associated hospitals are:
 Tallaght University Hospital
 St. James's Hospital
St Patrick's University Hospital
 Dublin Dental University Hospital
Naas General Hospital
Coombe Women & Infants University Hospital
Rotunda Hospital
Royal Victoria Eye and Ear Hospital
Children's Health Ireland at Crumlin
Peamount Hospital
National Rehabilitation Hospital

Associated Institutions 

 Royal Irish Academy of Music
Marino Institute of Education
 Church of Ireland Theological Institute

The School of Business in association with the Irish Management Institute forms the Trinity-IMI Graduate School of Management, incorporating the faculties of both organisations. Trinity College has also formerly been associated with several other teaching institutions, such as St Catherine's College of Education for Home Economics (now closed), Magee College and Royal Irish Academy of Music, a music conservatoire, and The Lir National Academy of Dramatic Art, the national conservatoire for theatre training actors, technicians, playwrights and designers to a professional and industry standard. The Lir is also advised by the Royal Academy of Dramatic Art in the UK.

Parliamentary representation

The university has been linked to parliamentary representation since 1613, when James I granted it the right to elect two members of parliament (MPs) to the Irish House of Commons. Since the new Constitution of Ireland in 1937, graduates of the university have formed a constituency which elects three Senators to Seanad Éireann. The current representatives of the university constituency are David Norris and Lynn Ruane, with one vacancy. Notable representatives have included Edward Gibson, W. E. H. Lecky, Edward Carson, Noel Browne, Conor Cruise O'Brien and Mary Robinson. The franchise was originally restricted to the Provost, Fellows and Scholars of Trinity College. This was expanded in 1832 to include those who had received an MA, and in 1918 all those who had received a degree from the university.

Academic profile
Since considerable academic restructuring in 2008, the college has three academic faculties:
 Arts, Humanities and Social Sciences
 Science, Technology, Engineering, and Mathematics
 Health Sciences

Each faculty is headed by a dean (there is also a Dean of Postgraduate Studies), and faculties are divided into schools, of which there were 24 as of 2021.

Academic year
The academic year is divided into three terms. Michaelmas term lasts from October to December; Hilary term from January to March; and Trinity term from April to June, with each term separated by a vacation. Whilst teaching takes place across all three terms in postgraduate courses, for undergraduate programmes, teaching is condensed within the first two terms since 2009, with each term consisting of a 12-week period of teaching known as the Teaching Term. These are followed by three revision weeks and a four-week exam period during the Trinity Term.

Internally at least, the weeks in the term are often referred to by the time elapsed since the start of teaching Term: thus the first week is called "1st week" or "week 1" and the last is "Week 12" or "12th week".

The first week of Trinity Term (which marks conclusion of lecturing for that year) is known as Trinity Week; normally preceded by a string of balls, it consists of a week of sporting and academic events. This includes the Trinity Ball and the Trinity Regatta (a premier social event on the Irish rowing calendar held since 1898), the election of Scholars and Fellows and a college banquet.

Second-level programmes
Since 2014, Trinity College's science department has established and operated a scheme for second-level students to study science, technology, engineering, and mathematics. The system, similar to DCU's CTYI programme, encourages academically gifted secondary students with a high aptitude for the STEM subjects, and was named the Walton Club in honour of Ernest Walton, Ireland's first and only Nobel laureate in physics. The programme was centred upon a pedagogic principle of "developing capacity for learning autonomy". The educators in the programme are PhD students in the college, who impart an advanced, undergraduate-level curriculum to the students. The club was set up with a specific ethos around the mentoring of STEM subjects, and not as a grinds school. The scheme, now in its third year, has been immensely successful and undergone growth in scope and scale year on year. It has also diversified beyond its traditional weekly club structure, running camps during school holidays to offer an opportunity to study STEM to those unable to join the club. It has also represented the college in many activities, meeting Chris Hadfield and attending the Young Scientist and Technology Exhibition and the Web Summit. Students, or alphas as they are dubbed in honour of the eponymous physicist, develop projects in the club, with innovations pioneered there including a health-focused electroencephalogram. The club was founded by Professors Igor Shvets and Arlene O'Neill of the School of Physics in Trinity College.

Undergraduate

Most undergraduate courses require four years of study. First-year students at the undergraduate level are called Junior Freshmen; second-years, Senior Freshmen; third-years, Junior Sophisters; and fourth-years, Senior Sophisters. After a 2017 proposal by the SU Equality Committee, the Trinity College Board approved a three-year process changing the titles of first and second years to Junior and Senior Fresh. Students must take the exams during Michaelmas term and during Trinity term of each year, and those who pass the exams can enter the next year. Students who score at least 70% on the exams will receive a first class honor degree, 60-69% an upper second class honor degree, 50-59% a lower second class honor degree, and 40-49% a third class honor degree.

Most non-professional courses take a Bachelor of Arts (BA) degree. As a matter of tradition, bachelor's degree graduates are eligible, after seven years from matriculation and without additional study, to purchase for a fee an upgrade of their bachelor's degree to a Master of Arts.

Degree titles vary according to the subject of study. The Law School awards the LL.B., the LL.B. (ling. franc.) and the LL.B. (ling. germ.). Other degrees include the BAI (engineering) and BBS (business studies). The BSc degree is not in wide use although it is awarded by the School of Nursing and Midwifery; most science and computer science students are awarded a BA.

From 2018, Trinity will be offering dual BA programme with Columbia University in New York City. Students of history, English, European studies or Middle Eastern and European languages and culture spend their first two years at Trinity and their last two years at Columbia.

Postgraduate
At postgraduate level, Trinity offers a range of taught and research degrees in all faculties. About 29% of students are post-graduate level, with 1,440 reading for a research degree and an additional 3,260 on taught courses (see Research and Innovation).

Trinity College's Strategic Plan sets "the objective of doubling the number of PhDs across all disciplines by 2013 in order to move towards a knowledge society. In order to achieve this, the college has received some of the largest allocations of Irish Government funding which have become competitively available to date."

In addition to academic degrees, the college offers Postgraduate Diploma (non-degree) qualifications, either directly or through associated institutions.

Research
The university operates an innovation center that promotes academic innovation and advising, provides patent counseling and research information, and facilitates the creation and operation of industrial labs and campus businesses.

In 1999, the university purchased an enterprise centre on Pearse Street, a seven-minute walk from the on-site "Innovation Center." The site has over 19,000 square meters of built space and includes a protected building, the Tower, which houses a Craft Centre. The Trinity Enterprise Centre is home to companies from Dublin's university research sector.

Admissions
Undergraduate applications from Irish, British and European Union applicants are submitted and processed through the Central Applications Office system. Trinity College instructs the CAO to administer all applications by standardised criteria before offering places to successful candidates. The college therefore has full control of admissions while ensuring anonymity and academic equality throughout the process. Admission to the university is highly competitive and based exclusively on academic merit. To be considered for admission, applicants must first reach the university's minimum matriculation requirements, which typically involves holding sufficient recognised qualifications in English, mathematics and a second language; the mathematics requirement can be waived if Latin is presented as a second language. Applicants for certain courses may be required to achieve more specific qualifications than those prescribed for minimum matriculation requirements.

Eligible applicants must then compete for places based on the results of their school leaving examinations, but can additionally take matriculation examinations which are held in the university in April, in which each subject is considered equivalent to that of the Irish Leaving Certificate. Applications for restricted courses require further assessment considered in the admissions process, such as the Health Professions Admissions Test (HPAT) for medicine or entrance tests for music and drama courses. As applications for most courses far exceed available places, admission is highly selective, demanding excellent grades in the aforementioned examinations. Through the CAO, candidates may list several courses at Trinity College and at other third-level institutions in Ireland in order of preference. The CAO awards places in mid-August every year after matching the number of places available to the applicants' academic attainments. Qualifications are measured as "points", with specific scales for the Leaving Certificate, UK GCE A-level, the International Baccalaureate and all other European Union school-leaving examinations.

In 2016, there were 3,220 new entrants out of 18,469 CAO applicants.

For applicants who are not citizens or residents of the European Union, different procedures apply. Disadvantaged, disabled, or mature students can also be admitted through a program that is separate from the CAO, the Trinity Access Programme, which aims to facilitate the entry of sectors of society which would otherwise be under-represented.

Students from non-European countries, such as the United States, may be admitted directly if they have passed the International Baccalaureate or EU/EFTA exams and meet the minimum admission requirements. Admission is not guaranteed and places will be filled in order of merit by the applicants with the highest score.

For those who have not taken the above exams, there is the one-year Foundation Program. This includes essays, discussions, question and answer sessions and training in study to prepare students for admission to Trinity College. Students must demonstrate proficiency in English to be admitted to the Foundation Program and must have a minimum score on the IELTS, TOEFL or Duolingo English Test (DET). Requirements also vary depending on the program. In addition to English language proficiency, students must meet the high school score.

Admission to graduate study is handled directly by Trinity College.

Awards

Entrance Exhibition and sizarship
Students who enter with exceptional Leaving Certificate or other public examination results are awarded an Entrance Exhibition. This entails a prize in the form of book tokens to the value of €150.00. Exhibitioners who are of limited means are made Sizars, entitled to Commons (evening meal) free of charge.

Foundation Scholarship

Undergraduate students of Senior Freshmen standing may elect to sit the Foundation Scholarship examination, which takes place in the Christmas Vacation, on the last week before Hilary term. On Trinity Monday (the first day of Trinity Term), the Board of the college sits and elects to the Scholarship all those who achieve First in the examination. Election to become a scholar of Trinity Dublin is widely regarded as "the most prestigious undergraduate award in the country". Those from EU member countries are entitled to free rooms and Commons (the college's Formal Hall), an annual stipend and exemption from fees for the duration of their scholarship, which lasts 15 terms. Scholars from non-EU member countries have their fees reduced by the current value of EU member fees. Scholars may add the suffix "SCH." to their names, have the note "discip. schol." appended to their name at Commencements and are entitled to wear Bachelor's Robes and a velvet mortarboard.

Competition for Scholarship involves a searching examination and successful candidates must be of exceptional ability. The concept of scholarship is a valued tradition of the college, and many of the college's most distinguished members were elected scholars (including Samuel Beckett and Ernest Walton). The Scholars' dinner, to which 'Scholars of the decade' (those elected in the current year, and every year multiple of a decade previous to it, e.g., 2013, 2003,..) are invited, forms one of the major events in Trinity's calendar. One of the main objectives is the pursuit of excellence, and one of the most tangible manifestations of this objective is the institution of the scholarship.

Under the Foundation Charter (of 1592), Scholars were part of the body corporate (three Scholars were named in the charter "in the name of many"). Until 1609 there were about 51 Scholars at any one time. A figure of 70 was permanently fixed in the revising Letters Patent of Charles I in 1637. Trinity Monday was appointed as the day when all future elections to Fellowship and Scholarship would be announced (at this time Trinity Monday was always celebrated on the Monday after the feast of the Holy Trinity). Up to this point, all undergraduates were Scholars, but soon after 1637 the practice of admitting students other than Scholars commenced.

Until 1856, only the classical subjects were examined. The questions concerned all the classical authors prescribed for the entrance examination and for the undergraduate course up to the middle of the Junior Sophister year. So candidates had no new material to read, 'but they had to submit to a very searching examination on the fairly lengthy list of classical texts which they were supposed by this time to have mastered'. The close link with the undergraduate syllabus is underlined by the refusal until 1856 to admit Scholars to the Library (a request for admission was rejected by the Board in 1842 on the grounds that Scholars should stick to their prescribed books and not indulge in 'those desultory habits' that admission to an extensive library would encourage). During the second half of the 19th century, the content of the examination gradually came to include other disciplines.

Around the turn of the 20th century, "Non-Foundation" Scholarships were introduced. This initially was a device to permit women to be, in effect, elected Scholars, despite the then commonly accepted legal view that the statute revision of 1637 permitted only males to be elected Foundation Scholars. Clearly, when women were not permitted in the college, this had not caused any difficulties, but with the admission of women as full members of the college, an anomaly was created. Non-Foundation Scholarship granted to the women elected to it all the rights of men, with the exception of voting rights at a meeting of the Body Corporate, a very rare event in any case. As women are now admitted to Foundation Scholarship on exactly the same basis as men, Non-Foundation Scholarships are retained as a device to allow for more than 70 persons to be Scholars at any one time provided they meet the qualifying standards. Foundation Scholarships are given to those whose performance is considered particularly exceptional, with the remaining qualifying persons that year being elected as Non-Foundation Scholars. While the number of Foundation Scholars remains fixed at 70, there is, in theory, no limit on the number of Non-Foundation Scholars. Non-Foundation and Foundation Scholars receive the same benefits and therefore the two groups are regarded in equal esteem and usually refer to themselves collectively as the Scholars of Trinity College Dublin.

Reputation
Trinity is ranked 98th in the world, 35th in Europe and 1st in Ireland in the Cuacarelli Simmons QS World University Rankings 2022, one of the world's leading indicators of university evaluation. The highest ranking was in 2009, when it was ranked 43rd in the world.

It is also ranked 146th in the world and 1st in Ireland in the Times Higher Education World University Rankings 2022.

In response to a long-term decline in rankings (from 43rd according to the last combined THE/QS ranking in 2009 to 88th in QS and 117th in THE for 2018), in 2014 Trinity announced a plan to reverse the trend, aiming to reenter the top 50. The dentistry program offered by the Dublin Dental University Hospital is ranked 51–75 in the world.

Student life

Societies

As of 2020, Trinity College has 120+ societies. Student societies operate under the aegis of the Dublin University Central Societies Committee (CSC).

Situated in the Graduates Memorial Building (GMB) are the three oldest societies: University Philosophical Society (the Phil), the College Historical Society (the Hist) and the College Theological Society (the Theo). The Phil meets each Thursday evening in the chamber of the GMB, the Hist meets each Wednesday evening and the Theo meets each Monday evening. Both the Phil and the Hist claim to be the oldest such student society: the Phil claims to have been founded in 1683, although university records list its foundation as having occurred in 1853, while the Hist was founded in 1770, making it the college's oldest society according to the Calendar. Among the Phil's Honorary Patrons are multiple Nobel Prize laureates, heads of state, notable actors, entertainers and well-known intellectuals, such as Al Pacino, Desmond Tutu, Sir Christopher Lee, Stephen Fry, and John Mearsheimer. The Hist has been addressed by many notable orators, including Winston Churchill and Ted Kennedy, and counts among its former members many prominent men and women in Ireland's history.

Other societies include Vincent de Paul Society (VDP), which organises a large number of charitable activities in the local community; DU Players, theatre and drama societies which hosts more than 50 shows and events a year in the Players Theatre; The DU Film Society, founded in 1987, which organises filmmakers and cinephiles in college through workshops, screenings, production funding, etc.; Trinity FM, which broadcasts six weeks a year on FM 97.3 with various student productions; and the Q Soc - Trinity LGBT society, which is Ireland's oldest LGBT society and celebrated its 25th anniversary in the 2007/08 year. The Card and Bridge Society holds weekly poker and bridge tournaments and was the starting point for many notable alumni, including Andy Black, Padraig Parkinson and Donnacha O'Dea; the Dublin University Comedy Society, known as DU Comedy, hosts comedy events for its members and has hosted gigs in college by comedians such as Andrew Maxwell, David O'Doherty, Neil Delamere and Colin Murphy; The Dance Society, known as "", provides classes in Latin and ballroom dancing, as well as running events around other styles, such as swing dancing. In 2011 the Laurentian Society was revived. It had played a key role as a society for the few Catholic students who studied at Trinity while "the Ban" was still in force. The Trinity Fashion Society was established in 2009, and holds an annual charity fashion show and an international trip to London Fashion Week.

Clubs

Trinity has a sporting tradition, and the college has 50 sports clubs affiliated to the Dublin University Central Athletic Club (DUCAC).

The Central Athletic Club is made up of five committees that oversee the development of sport in the college: the executive committee, which is responsible overall for all activities; the Captains' Committee, which represents the 49 club captains and awards University Colours (Pinks); the Pavilion Bar Committee, which runs the private members' bar; the Pavilion Members' Committee; and the Sports Facilities Committee.

The oldest clubs include the Dublin University Cricket Club (1835) and the Dublin University Boat Club (1836). Dublin University Football Club, founded in 1854, plays rugby union and is the world's oldest documented "football club". Dublin University A.F.C., founded in 1883, is the oldest surviving association football club in the Republic of Ireland. The Dublin University Hockey Club was founded in 1893, and the Dublin University Harriers and Athletic Club in 1885.

The newest club in the university is the American football team, who were accepted into the Irish American Football League (IAFL) in 2008. The Dublin University Fencing Club has won a total of 43 titles in 66 years. While the modern DU Fencing Club was founded in 1936, its origins can be dated to the 1700s when a 'Gentleman's Club of the Sword' existed, primarily for duelling practice.

Publications
Trinity College has a tradition of student publications, ranging from the serious to the satirical. Most student publications are administered by Trinity Publications, previously called the Dublin University Publications Committee (often known as 'Pubs'), which maintains and administers the Publications office (located in No 6) and all the associated equipment needed to publish newspapers and magazines.

From 1869 to 1893 the literary magazine Kottabos was published, edited by Robert Yelverton Tyrrell. It has been called 'perhaps the cream of Irish academic wit and scholarship'.

There are two rival student newspapers: The University Times and Trinity News. The University Times is funded by the Students' Union and has won national and international awards since its inception in 2009, including the award for best non-daily student newspaper in the world from the US-based Society of Professional Journalists. Trinity News is Ireland's oldest student newspaper, launched in 1953. It publishes both an online edition and a print edition every three weeks during the academic year. For the last 10 years the paper has been edited by a full-time student editor, who takes a sabbatical year from their studies, supported by a voluntary part-time staff of 30 student section editors and writers.

Student magazines currently in publication include the satirical newspaper The Piranha (formerly Piranha! magazine but rebranded in 2009), the generalist T.C.D. Miscellany (founded in 1895; one of Ireland's oldest magazines), the film journal Trinity Film Review (TFR) and the literary Icarus. Other publications include the Student Economic Review and the Trinity College Law Review, produced independently by students of economics and law respectively; the Trinity College Journal of Postgraduate Research, produced by the Graduate Students Union; the Social and Political Review (SPR); the Trinity Student Medical Journal; and The Attic, student writing produced by the Dublin University Literary Society. More recent publications include The Burkean Journal, a politically and culturally conservative magazine named after one of Trinity's most notable alumni, Edmund Burke.

The Trinity Ball

The Trinity Ball is an annual event that draws 7,000 attendants. Until 2010, it was held annually on the last teaching day of Trinity term to celebrate the end of lectures and the beginning of Trinity Week. Due to a restructuring of the teaching terms of the college, the 2010 Ball was held on the last day of Trinity Week. In 2011, the ball was held on the final day of teaching of Hilary Term, before the commencement of Trinity Week. The Ball is run by Trinity Ents, Trinity Students' Union and Trinity's Central Societies Committee in conjunction with event promoters MCD Productions, who held the contract to run the Ball until 2012. The Ball celebrated its 50th anniversary in 2009.

Students' Union

The Students' Union's primary role is to provide a recognised representative channel between undergraduates and the university and college authorities. The Campaigns Executive, the Administrative Executive and Sabbatical Officers manage the business and affairs of the Union. The Sabbatical Officers are: The President, Communications Officer, Welfare Officer, Education Officer and Entertainments Officer and are elected on an annual basis; all capitated students are entitled to vote. The SU President, Welfare Officer and Education Officer are ex-officio members of the College Board.

The Graduate Students' Union's primary role is to provide a recognised representative channel between postgraduates and the university and college authorities. The GSU president is an ex-officio member of the College Board.

Traditions and culture

Commons

Commons is a three-course meal served in the College Dining Hall Monday to Friday, attended by Scholars, Fellows and Sizars of the college, as well as other members of the college community and their guests.

Commons starts at 18:15 during the week, and its start is signalled by a dramatic slamming of the Dining Hall doors. The bell of the Campanile in the college is rung at 18:00 to inform those attending the dinner.

A Latin Grace is said "before and after dinner", read by one of the scholars.

During Advent, members of the Chapel Choir sing Christmas carols to accompany the meals.

Trinity Week
Trinity Week begins each year on Trinity Monday in mid-April.

The start of Trinity Week is marked by the election of Fellows and Scholars to the College on Trinity Monday. The board of the college, having chosen the new Scholars (those who achieved a First in the Foundation Scholarship) and Fellows, announce in front square those appointed, before an ecumenical service is held in the College Chapel, with music sung by the Chapel Choir.

Other traditions

Trinity has a longstanding rivalry with nearby University College Dublin, which is largely friendly in nature. Every year, Colours events are contested between the sporting clubs of each University, as well as between their respective debating societies.

Most students of the college (undergraduates especially) never walk underneath the Campanile, as the tradition suggests that should the bell ring whilst they pass under it, they will fail their annual examinations. This is negated only if they touch the foot of the statue of George Salmon within five seconds of the bell ringing.

In popular culture
Parts of Michael Collins, The First Great Train Robbery, Circle of Friends, Educating Rita, Ek Tha Tiger and Quackser Fortune Has a Cousin in the Bronx were filmed in Trinity College. It served as the filming location for Luftwaffe headquarters in The Blue Max.

The Irish writer J. P. Donleavy was a student in Trinity. A number of his books feature characters who attend Trinity, including The Ginger Man and The Beastly Beatitudes of Balthazar B.

Fictional Naval Surgeon Stephen Maturin of Patrick O'Brian's popular Aubrey–Maturin series is a graduate of Trinity College. The character is played by Paul Bettany in the 2003 film Master and Commander: The Far Side of the World.

In the Channel 4 television series Hollyoaks, Craig Dean attends Trinity College. He left Hollyoaks to study in Ireland in 2007 and now lives there with his boyfriend, John Paul McQueen, after they got their sunset ending in September 2008.

In the Star Trek: Voyager episode Fair Haven set in a holographic 19th century Ireland near Dublin, Captain Janeway reprograms the hologram character Michael Sullivan to have "the education of a 19th century 3rd year student at Trinity College".

Claire Kilroy's novel All Names Have Been Changed is set in Trinity College in the 1990s. The story follows a group of creative writing students and their enigmatic professor. A photograph of Trinity is used in the cover art.

Barry McCrea's novel The First Verse is set in Trinity College. The narrative focuses on freshman Niall Lenihan's search for identity and companionship and details his involvement with mysticism at the college.

In Karen Marie Moning's The Fever Series Trinity College is said to be where the main character, MacKayla Lane's sister Alina, was attending school on scholarship before she was murdered. The college is also where several of the minor characters who inform Ms. Lane about her sister are said to work.

In Cecelia Ahern's novel Thanks for the Memories, Justin Hitchcock is a guest lecturer at Trinity College.

The Oscar Wilde Memorial Sculpture in Dublin's Merrion Square depicts Wilde wearing the Trinity College post graduate tie.

In Sally Rooney's 2018 novel Normal People and its 2020 television adaptation, the main characters, Connell Waldron and Marianne Sheridan, are students at Trinity College and are elected scholars. Rooney studied English as a scholar in Trinity. In the television adaptation, Connell is played by former Trinity College (The Lir Academy) student Paul Mescal; two other actors in the series, Frank Blake (who plays Marianne's older brother Alan) and Kwaku Fortune (who plays Philip, a friend of Marianne's at Trinity), are also alumni of the Lir Academy. Series director and executive producer Lenny Abrahamson studied philosophy at Trinity and was also elected a scholar. Following the broadcast of the series, Trinity was widely reported to have received a substantial increase in applications, to a total of over 40,000, including a small increase in applications from the United Kingdom.

Notable people

Amongst the past students/graduates (and some staff) are such notable figures as:

 Samuel Beckett (Nobel Laureate in Literature)
 George Berkeley
 Daniel Bradley
 Francis Brambell
 Edmund Burke
 J.B. Bury
 William Campbell (Nobel Laureate in Medicine)
 Michael Coey
 William Congreve
 Daniel Condren               
 Thomas Davis
 Henry Horatio Dixon
 Edward Dowden
 Francis Ysidro Edgeworth
 Robert Emmet
 George Francis FitzGerald
 Gordon Foster
 Edward Francis Bani Forster
 Percy French
 Oliver Goldsmith
 Henry Grattan
 Veronica Guerin
 William Rowan Hamilton
 Edward Hincks
 Michael Roberts Westropp
 Nathaniel Hone the Younger
 Ludwig Hopf
 John Kells Ingram
 Peter Lalor
 John Hewitt Jellett
 John Joly
 Dionysius Lardner
 Sheridan Le Fanu
 Bartholomew Lloyd
 Humphrey Lloyd (physicist)
 Thomas Ranken Lyle
 James MacCullagh
 Mairead Maguire (Nobel Peace Prize)
 Edmond Malone
 Charles Maturin
 Albert Joseph McConnell
 George Francis Mitchell
 Richard Maunsell
 William Molyneux
 Hans Motz
 Charles Algernon Parsons
 Thomas Preston
 Louise Richardson
 George Salmon
 Brendan Scaife
 Erwin Schrödinger
 Samson Shatashvili
 Edward Stafford
 Bram Stoker
 George Johnstone Stoney
 Jonathan Swift
 James Joseph Sylvester
 Edward Hutchinson Synge
 John Lighton Synge
 John Millington Synge
 John Trenchard
 Wolfe Tone
 John Winthrop Hackett
 Frederick Thomas Trouton
 Jaja Wachuku
 Ernest Walton (Nobel Laureate in Physics)
 Denis Weaire
 E. T. Whittaker
 Oscar Wilde
 Katie McGrath

Others include four previous holders of the office of President of Ireland, Douglas Hyde, Éamon de Valera, Mary Robinson and Mary McAleese, and two holders of the office of Taoiseach, Éamon de Valera, and Leo Varadkar. (De Valera matriculated as "Edward de Valera".)

See also

 Academic dress of the University of Dublin
 Dublin University (constituency)
 Education in the Republic of Ireland
 List of chancellors of the University of Dublin
 List of professorships at the University of Dublin
 List of universities in the Republic of Ireland
 Trinity Hall, Dublin

Notes

References

Further reading
 Aalen, F. H. A., and R. J. Hunter. “The Estate Maps of Trinity College: An Introduction and Annotated Catalogue.” Hermathena, no. 98 (1964): 85–96. online
 Auchmuty, James Johnston. Sir Thomas Wyse, 1791-1862: the life and career of an educator and diplomat (PS King & sons, 1939).
 Bailey, Kenneth Claude A History of Trinity College Dublin, 1892-1945 (Trinity College Dublin, 1947)
 Black, R. D. "Trinity College, Dublin, and the theory of value, 1832-1863." Economica 12.47 (1945): 140-148 online.
 Bewley, Dame Beulah. "Ireland's first school of medicine" History Ireland 19.4 (2011): 24-27 online
 Dixon, William Macneile. Trinity College, Dublin. (F.E. Robinson, 1902) online
 Finn, Gerry P.T. "Trinity Mysteries: University, Elite Schooling and Sport in Ireland" International Journal of the History of Sport (2010) 27#13 pp 2255–2287. covers 1800 to 1970. 
 Fox, Peter.  Trinity College Library Dublin: A History (Cambridge UP, 2014).
 Gogarty, Claire. "Building Finances of Trinity College, Dublin, in the Early Eighteenth Century." Dublin Historical Record 50#1 (1997): 71–75. online.
 Harford, Judith. The opening of university education to women in Ireland (Irish Academic Press, 2008).
 Irish, Tomás. "Trinity College Dublin: An Imperial University in War and Revolution, 1914–1921." in The Academic World in the Era of the Great War (Palgrave Macmillan, 2018) pp. 119–139.
 Jackson, P. S. Wyse. "The botanic garden of Trinity college Dublin 1687 to 1987." Botanical journal of the Linnean Society 95.4 (1987): 301–311.
 Kelly, Laura. Irish medical education and student culture, c. 1850-1950 (Oxford UP, 2018).
 Kirkpatrick, T. Percy C.  History of the medical teaching in Trinity College Dublin and of the School of Physic in Ireland (Hanna and Neale, 1912) online.
 Luce, John Victor, ed. Trinity College Dublin, the first 400 years (Trinity College Dublin quatercentenary series, 1992).
 McDowell, Robert Brendan, and David Allardice Webb. Trinity College Dublin, 1592-1952: an academic history (Trinity College Dublin Press, 2004) online.
 McGurk, John. "Trinity College, Dublin: 1592-1992." History Today 42.3 (1992): 41–47.
 Mahaffy, John Pentland. An epoch in Irish history: Trinity College, Dublin, its foundation and early fortunes, 1591-1660 (T. Fisher Unwin, 1906)  online.
 Morris, Ewan. "'God Save the King' Versus 'The Soldier's Song': The 1929 Trinity College National Anthem Dispute and the Politics of the Irish Free State." Irish Historical Studies 31.121 (1998): 72-90 online.
 Moss, Jean Dietz. "'Discordant Consensus': Old and New Rhetoric at Trinity College, Dublin." Rhetorica 14.4 (1996): 383–441.
 O'Farrell, Fergus. "Trinity v.  UCD." History Ireland 23.4 (2015): 48-49 online, student rivalry.
 Parkes, Susan M., ed. A danger to the men?: a history of women in Trinity College Dublin 1904-2004 (Lilliput Press, 2004).
 Pašeta, Senia. "Trinity College, Dublin, and the Education of Irish Catholics, 1873-1908." Studia Hibernica 30 (1998): 7-20 online.
 Post, Robert M. "Forensic activities at Trinity college, Dublin, in the eighteenth century." Communication Studies 19.1 (1968): 19–25.
 Raraty, M. M. "The Chair of German at Trinity College, Dublin 1775-1866." Hermathena (1966): 53-72 online.
 Rembert, James A. W. "Dialectic at Trinity College, Dublin." in Swift and the Dialectical Tradition (Palgrave Macmillan, 1988) pp. 63–72. online
 Stanford, William Bedell.  "Classical Studies in Trinity College, Dublin, since the Foundation." Hermathena 57 (1941): 3-24. online
 Urwick, William. The Early History of Trinity College Dublin 1591-1660: As Told in Contemporary Records on Occasion of Its Tercentenary (T. Fisher Unwin Paternoster Square, 1892) online.
 Ussher, H. "Account of the Observatory Belonging to Trinity College, Dublin." Transactions of the Royal Irish Academy 1 (1787): 3-21. online.
 Walsh, John. "‘The problem of Trinity College Dublin’: a historical perspective on rationalisation in higher education in Ireland." Irish Educational Studies 33.1 (2014): 5-19.
 Webb, David A. "The herbarium of Trinity College, Dublin: its history and contents." Botanical journal of the Linnean Society 106.4 (1991): 295–327.
 West, Trevor. The bold collegians: the development of sport in Trinity College, Dublin (Lilliput Press in association with DUCAC, 1991).

External links

 Official website
 Photo gallery of Trinity College
 Trinity College official history
 Buildings of Trinity College at Archiseek
 Satellite Photo of Trinity College
 Masters Programmes at Trinity College
 Satellite Photo of Trinity Hall
 Scarves of the University of Dublin
 The Trinity Ball
 Trinity News
 Trinity College Central Societies Committee
 Trinity College Dublin Students' Union
 360 Panorama of Long Room Library

 
1592 establishments in Ireland
Anglican schools in the Republic of Ireland
Archives in the Republic of Ireland
Educational institutions established in the 1590s
Education in Dublin (city)
University of Dublin
Constituent colleges